The Heineken Kidnapping is a 2011 Dutch crime film directed by Maarten Treurniet, based on the kidnapping of Freddy Heineken.

Cast

Premise
A bold and amateur kidnapping goes wildly awry in this fictionalized account of beer magnate Alfred Heineken 1983 abduction, which would go on to become one of The Netherlands' most infamous crimes.

See also
Kidnapping Freddy Heineken - 2015 film of the same events

References

External links 

2011 crime films
2011 films
Films scored by Junkie XL
Dutch crime films
Films about hostage takings